Kim Min-seok (born March 26, 1990), better known by his stage name Xiumin, is a South Korean singer and actor. He is best known as a member of the South Korean-Chinese boy band Exo, its sub-group Exo-M and its sub-unit Exo-CBX. He debuted as a soloist on September 26, 2022 with the release of his EP, Brand New.

Name
His stage name is a combination of the Chinese reading of hanja characters 秀 (xiù), which means great or show, and 珉 (mín) which is part of his birth name.

Life and career

1990–2013: Early life and career beginnings

Xiumin was born on March 26, 1990 in Seoul and grew up in Guri, Gyeonggi Province. He was a student at Catholic Kwandong University where he attended a seminar and gave a presentation for students in Applied Music. Xiumin learned martial arts and has a black belt in Kendo and Taekwondo. He also trained in Wushu and Fencing. Xiumin is also known as an avid fan of football, and is an honorary ambassador of the Korea Football Association.

Before Xiumin's participation in SM's Everysing Contest, he had auditioned for JYP entertainment in 2008 but was rejected.
In 2008, Xiumin won second place in the SM Everysing Contest. He later became a trainee through SM Entertainment's Casting System in the same year.

Xiumin was revealed as the seventh member of South Korean-Chinese boy group Exo in January 2012. The group debuted on April 8, 2012. In 2013, Xiumin made a guest appearance alongside actress Kim Yoo-jung in the music video for the song "Gone" by South Korean singer Jin, now a member of Lovelyz.

2015–2020: Acting roles and Exo-CBX

In January 2015, Xiumin made his musical theatre debut, playing the character of Aquila in the SM Entertainment musical School OZ alongside labelmates Changmin, Key, Luna, Suho, and Seulgi. In October 2015, Xiumin played the leading role opposite actress Kim So-eun in the web drama Falling for Challenge. He also released his first solo song since debut titled "You Are the One" as a soundtrack of the web drama. Falling for Challenge was the most watched web drama in South Korea in 2015, reaching 20 million views just after 17 days.

In February 2016, Xiumin was featured in AOA member Jimin's solo single "Call You Bae", and appeared in its music video. In July 2016, he made his big screen debut alongside Yoo Seung-ho in the South Korean film Seondal: The Man Who Sells the River. In August 2016, he collaborated with fellow Exo members Chen, and Baekhyun on an original soundtrack titled "For You" for the television series Moon Lovers: Scarlet Heart Ryeo. In October 2016, together with Chen and Baekhyun, Xiumin became a member of Exo's first official sub unit Exo-CBX. The group made their debut with the extended play Hey Mama! on October 31.

In July 2017, Xiumin collaborated with NCT member Mark on a single titled "Young & Free" for S.M. Entertainment's digital music project Station. In August, he became a regular cast member on the MBC reality TV show It's Dangerous Beyond The Blankets.

Xiumin enlisted for his mandatory military service on May 7, 2019, serving active duty. He performed his final concerts before his enlistment with Exo-CBX's Magical Circus - Special Edition concert in Japan, and his solo fan meeting concert, Xiuweet Time, at Jamsil Arena on May 4. Following his enlistment, he released his debut solo single, "You", which is part of SM Station, on May 9. In August 2019, it was reported that Xiumin would be starring in an army musical titled "Return: The Promise of That Day" together with Shinee member Onew and Yoon Ji-sung, which ran from October 22 to December 1 at the Olympic Park’s Woori Art Hall in Seoul. Xiumin took his final military leave in November 2020, and did not return to the army due to the military's policy on COVID-19; he was discharged on December 6.

2022: Solo debut
On September 26, Xiumin released his debut EP, Brand New, alongside its lead single of the same name. Brand New is a retro K-pop record, which brings "nostalgic '90s sonic euphoria to listeners" according to The Korea Herald.

Discography

Extended plays

Singles

Notes

Filmography

Movies

Television series

Web series

Television shows

Web shows

Radio shows

Documentaries

Videography

Music videos

Theater

Fanmeetings

Ambassadorship

Awards and nominations

References

External links

 Xiumin at SM Town

1990 births
Living people
People from Guri
Exo members
South Korean male singers
South Korean male television actors
South Korean male film actors
South Korean male idols
K-pop singers
South Korean mandopop singers
South Korean pop singers
South Korean contemporary R&B singers
South Korean dance music singers
South Korean electronic music singers
South Korean male web series actors
Mandarin-language singers of South Korea
Japanese-language singers of South Korea
21st-century South Korean singers